Fatal Fury 3: Road to the Final Victory is a 1995 head-to-head fighting game released by SNK for the Neo-Geo arcade and home platforms. It is the fourth game in the Fatal Fury series after Fatal Fury Special (which was an updated version of Fatal Fury 2). Console versions of Fatal Fury 3 were released for the Neo Geo CD, Sega Saturn, Windows-based computers and on the Wii Virtual Console. The game is also included in the compilation Fatal Fury Battle Archives Volume 1 for the PlayStation 2.

Gameplay 

Fatal Fury 3 retains the format and controls of the previous game in the series, Fatal Fury Special. However, the two-plane battle stages have been revamped into a three-plane format known as the Oversway System. The player fights primarily in the middle plane or the main plane, but can move or "oversway" into either of the sway lines at the background (LP+LK) or foreground (LK+HP). When the player performs an attack in a sway plane (or an Oversway Attack), their character will return to the main plane. Likewise, the player can attack an opponent who is in a Sway Plane with an Anti-Oversway Attack. The player can also do a "Quick Sway" to avoid an attack, leaving the opponent vulnerable to a regular attack.

Other new techniques introduced in this installment includes controlling the height of the character's jump, block an opponent's attack at mid-air (Air Guard), and a new type of combo techniques known as Combination Arts, allowing the player to cancel a specific series (which varies between characters) of regular attacks from one to the other. In addition to the regular Special Moves, and the Super Special Moves which can only be performed when the life gauge is flashing red, each character also has a "Hidden Ability", which is a stronger version of a Super Special Move. A Hidden Ability occurs once in every 1024 chances whenever the player inputs the command for the character's Super Special Move. A Hidden Ability can also be used by activating "Super Mode" before a match using a secret code. The player then enters a specific command for the Hidden Ability when the life gauge is flashing red. Unlike Super Special Moves, a Hidden Ability can only be used once per round.

Fatal Fury 3 also features a Fighting Level system when fighting against the computer. When the player completes a round, their performance is graded from E to S. The final opponents the player faces at the end of the Single Player Mode is determined then by the player's average.

The player will have a choice among four characters as their first opponent (Joe, Mary, Bob, and Franco). After the first four opponents are defeated, the player will fight against Ryuji Yamazaki for a plot-based match in which the player must win only one round. The player will then proceed to fight against Mai, Andy, Hon-Fu, Sokaku, Terry, and Geese, in that order, before fighting Yamazaki again for a full match. Depending on the grade average, the game will either end against Yamazaki, or the player will fight against either, or both, of the Jin twins, starting with Chon Shu and ending with Chon Rei.

Plot
Three years have passed since Terry Bogard had defeated Wolfgang Krauser and won the second "King of Fighters" tournament. Ever since then, Terry has traveled throughout the world, meeting new friends and battling many opponents along the way. Upon returning home to South Town, Terry rendezvouses with his young brother Andy and his good friends Joe and Mai at the grand opening of the Pao Pao Cafe 2 that's being headed by Richard Meyer and his capoeira apprentice Bob Wilson. During the opening, Joe explains to Terry a disturbing rumor that he had gotten from Cheng Sinzan via a private message in that Geese Howard is supposedly alive, having survived his fatal fall from his personal tower four years prior and faking his death to the public so that he could slowly recover in secret and plan his revenge against Terry, who had defeated him in the first "King of Fighters" tournament. Upon hearing and learning of this, Terry and his friends set out to confirm on whether or not Geese is still alive, not knowing that their personal investigation is only a small part of a bigger threat which involves a dangerous Japanese criminal, two young Chinese orphans, and three sacred scrolls that could easily endanger South Town and the rest of the world.

Fighters
Returning fighters:
 Terry Bogard (v.b. Satoshi Hashimoto)
 Andy Bogard (v.b. Keiichi Nanba)
 Joe Higashi (v.b. Nobuyuki Hiyama)
 Mai Shiranui (v.b. Akoya Sogi)
 Geese Howard (v.b. Kong Kuwata)

New fighters:
 Sokaku Mochizuki (v.b. Kōji Ishii) - a Japanese Buddhist monk whose clan are the sworn enemies of the Shiranui school.
 Bob Wilson (v.b. Toshiyuki Morikawa) - a capoeira master from Brazil who is employed as a waiter by Richard Meyer.
 Hon-Fu (v.b. Toshiyuki Morikawa) - a nunchaku-wielding cop from Hong Kong who has come to South Town in order to find and arrest Yamazaki.
 Blue Mary (v.b. Harumi Ikoma) - a blonde-haired female agent who uses combat sambo and is Terry's love interest.
 Franco Bash (v.b. B. J. Love) - an Italian American kickboxer who is fighting to rescue and save his kidnapped young son from Yamazaki.

Bosses:
 Ryuji Yamazaki (v.b. Kōji Ishii) - a dangerous Japanese criminal who fights with one hand in his pocket.
 Jin Chonshu (v.b. by Kappei Yamaguchi) - a young Chinese orphan boy who is seeking the Sacred Scrolls of the Jin.
 Jin Chonrei (v.b. Kappei Yamaguchi) - Chonshu's elder twin brother, who aids and assists his young twin brother as both his personal protector and bodyguard.

Reception
In Japan, Game Machine listed Fatal Fury 3: Road to the Final Victory on their May 1, 1995 issue as being the second most-popular arcade game at the time. According to Famitsu, the AES version sold over 34,810 copies in its first week on the market.

On release, Famicom Tsūshin scored the Neo Geo version of the game a 32 out of 40. The four reviewers of Electronic Gaming Monthly scored it a 7.675 out of 10. They had widely varied reactions to the game, and two of them remarked that it lacked the "feel" of a Fatal Fury game, but all four rated it as a very playable fighting game which is worth at least trying in the arcade. While acknowledging that Fatal Fury fans might be disappointed by the reduced roster of fighters, GamePro praised the new third fighting plane and ranking system, and concluded that "Instead of simply adding more fighters, FF3 does more with fewer fighters (hidden moves and so on) and a unique method of gameplay." They gave the Neo Geo CD a generally positive review as well, remarking that Bob and Franco are "uninteresting" new characters but praising the detailed stages, the controls, and the modifications to Mai's Swan Dive attack.

In a retrospective review, Maximum highly praised the game's adaptation of combos and special moves, and argued that if it were not for the difficulty in executing super power moves, Fatal Fury 3 would have become the leading action game in the arcades. They gave it 4 out of 5 stars.

Next Generation reviewed the Neo-Geo version of the game, rating it two stars out of five, and stated that "The players are all able, even if just for a few seconds, to slip out of the line of fire either to avoid enemy attack or to set up for an offensive move. Beyond this feature the game is standard fare."

Notes

References

External links
GAMEBANK page
Fatal Fury 3: Road to the Final Victory at GameFAQs
Fatal Fury 3: Road to the Final Victory at Giant Bomb
Fatal Fury 3: Road to the Final Victory at Killer List of Videogames
Fatal Fury 3: Road to the Final Victory at MobyGames

1995 video games
ACA Neo Geo games
Arcade video games
D4 Enterprise games
Fatal Fury
Fighting games
Kinesoft games
Multiplayer and single-player video games
Neo Geo games
Neo Geo CD games
Nintendo Switch games
NuFX games
PlayStation 4 games
PlayStation Network games
Sega Saturn games
SIMS Co., Ltd. games
SNK games
SNK Playmore games
Video games scored by Masahiko Hataya
Virtual Console games
Windows games
Video games developed in Japan
Xbox One games
Hamster Corporation games
CyberFront games